The Maynard Pioneer Museum and Park is a museum and park located within Maynard, Arkansas. The museum was established  in 1979.

The centerpiece of the museum is a log cabin dating to the late 19th and early 20th century, with original furnishings and historic newspaper clippings. There are also a variety of period photographs donated by local Randolph County residents. A museum  annex was built in 1982, housing examples of period furniture and other objects. 

Every year, the Maynard Pioneer Museum holds "Pioneer Day". Students from Maynard High School set up booths and games for the day. The events include a "You might be a redneck" joke competition and a Pet Parade.

External links
Maynard Pioneer Museum and Park - Randolph County Tourism
Arkansas Dept. of Parks & Tourism: Maynard Pioneer Museum & Park
Photos

History museums in Arkansas
Museums in Randolph County, Arkansas